The 1904 Notre Dame football team was an American football team that represented the University of Notre Dame in the 1904 college football season. In its first season with Louis J. Salmon as coach, the team compiled a  record and was outscored by opponents by a combined total

Schedule

References

Notre Dame
Notre Dame Fighting Irish football seasons
Notre Dame football